The David di Donatello Award for Best Film (Italian: David di Donatello per il miglior film) is one of the David di Donatello awards presented annually by the Accademia del Cinema Italiano (ACI). The award recognizes the most outstanding Italian film theatrically released in Italy during the year preceding the ceremony. The award was first given in 1970, and became competitive in 1981. 

Nominees and winners are selected via runoff voting by all the members of the Accademia.

Winners and nominees
Below, winners are listed first in the colored row, followed by other nominees.

1970s

1980s

1990s

2000s

2010s

2020s

See also
 Nastro d'Argento
 Academy Award for Best Picture
 Academy Award for Best Foreign Language Film (list of submissions)
 Cinema of Italy

References

External links
 
 Daviddidonatello.it (official site)

David di Donatello
Awards for best film